The 2011 BNP Paribas Open was a tennis tournament played at Indian Wells, California in March 2011. It was the 37th edition of the event, known as the BNP Paribas Open, and was classified as an ATP World Tour Masters 1000 event on the 2011 ATP World Tour and a Premier Mandatory event on the 2011 WTA Tour. Both the men's and the women's events took place at the Indian Wells Tennis Garden in Indian Wells, California, United States from March 7 through March 20, 2011.

Květa Peschke and Katarina Srebotnik were the defending champions, but lost in the first round to Klaudia Jans and Alicja Rosolska.
Unseeded pair Sania Mirza and Elena Vesnina won the tournament, defeating 8th seeds Bethanie Mattek-Sands and Meghann Shaughnessy 6–0, 7–5 in the final.

Seeds

Draw

Finals

Top half

Bottom half

References
Main Draw

BNP Paribas Open - Women's Doubles